Tetracha panamensis is a species of tiger beetle that was described by Johnson in 1991.

References

Cicindelidae
Beetles of North America
Beetles of Central America
Beetles described in 1991